Hamburg is a village in Calhoun County, Illinois, United States. The population was 99 at the 2020 census, down from 128 at the 2010 census.

Geography
Hamburg is located at  (39.231277, -90.716207).

History
One hundred lots in the town of Hamburg were offered for sale by John Shaw in 1836.  Once a thriving river community where apples were loaded and shipped, banks were busy and profitable, stores were laden with goods and shoppers, Hamburg now sits quietly along and sometimes in the waters of the Mississippi.  The only public facility is the Hamburg Post Office.  A bluff top monument overlooks the village, indicating the burial of riverboat Captain Swarnes who wished to be buried upright to command a panoramic view of the river.  National Geographic, September 1975; pages 308 and 309, published a picture of the Delta Queen heading up the Mississippi river past Hamburg, using Captain Swarnes' monument as the photographer's vantage point.

Demographics

As of the 2020 census there were 99 people, 42 households, and 35 families residing in the village. The racial makeup of the village was 79.80% White, 2.02% African American, 0.00% Native American, 1.01% Asian, 2.02% from other races, and 15.15% from two or more races. Hispanic or Latino of any race were 5.05% of the population.

There were 42 households, out of which 92.86% had children under the age of 18 living with them, 71.43% were married couples living together, 11.90% had a female householder with no husband present, and 16.67% were non-families. 9.52% of all households were made up of individuals, and 9.52% had someone living alone who was 65 years of age or older. The average household size was 4.09 and the average family size was 3.64.

The village's age distribution consisted of 25.5% under the age of 18, 0.0% from 18 to 24, 15.1% from 25 to 44, 32.7% from 45 to 64, and 26.8% who were 65 years of age or older. The median age was 57.2 years. For every 100 females, there were 168.4 males. For every 100 females age 18 and over, there were 123.5 males.

The median income for a household in the village was $38,571, and the median income for a family was $38,036. Males had a median income of $20,625 versus $23,472 for females. The per capita income for the village was $13,999. About 8.6% of families and 15.0% of the population were below the poverty line, including 48.7% of those under age 18 and 0.0% of those age 65 or over.

References

Villages in Calhoun County, Illinois
Illinois populated places on the Mississippi River
Populated places established in 1836
1836 establishments in Illinois